Jana Burčeska (born 6 July 1993) is a Macedonian singer. She represented Macedonia in the Eurovision Song Contest 2017 in Ukraine, with the song "Dance Alone". Burčeska first came to prominence in her native country in 2011 after competing in Macedonian Idol.

During the Eurovision Song Contest 2022, she acted as a press assistant and jury voting spokesperson for the Macedonian Radio Television.

Biography
In 2011, Burčeska competed in Macedonian Idol and came fifth. On 21 November 2016, Macedonian Radio Television announced that the singer would represent Macedonia in the Eurovision Song Contest 2017, with the song "Dance Alone". She took part in the second semi-final of the contest on 11 May 2017, however failed to qualify to the final, placing 15th with 69 points. In her Eurovision postcard, aired before her performance, she announced her pregnancy. Later that evening, when interviewed on-air by host Timur Miroshnychenko, her boyfriend Alexander proposed to her and she accepted. The news made headlines worldwide with a few news outlets stating it "stole the show".

In October 2017, Burčeska gave birth to a baby girl named Dona.

Discography

Singles

References

External links

Official website

1993 births
Musicians from Skopje
Living people
21st-century Macedonian women singers
Eurovision Song Contest entrants for North Macedonia
Eurovision Song Contest entrants of 2017
Idols (franchise) participants